Charles Richard William Beasley  is a New Zealand academic physician, the founder and Director of the Medical Research Institute of New Zealand, and as of 2019 is a full professor at the Victoria University of Wellington.

Academic career

After studying medicine at the University of Otago, Beasley rose to full  professor at Victoria University of Wellington, with connections to Wellington Hospital and the universities of Otago and University of Southampton.

Beasley has received multiple grants from the Health Research Council of New Zealand.

In the 2008 Queen's Birthday Honours, Beasley was appointed a Companion of the New Zealand Order of Merit, for services to medical research, in particular asthma. He was elected a Fellow of the Royal Society of New Zealand in 2015. In 2019, he was awarded the Health Research Council of New Zealand 's Beaven Medal.

Selected works 
 Masoli, Matthew, Denise Fabian, Shaun Holt, Richard Beasley, and Global Initiative for Asthma (GINA) Program. "The global burden of asthma: executive summary of the GINA Dissemination Committee report." Allergy 59, no. 5 (2004): 469–478.
 Asher, M. I., Ulrich Keil, H. R. Anderson, R. Beasley, J. Crane, Fernando Martinez, E. A. Mitchell, N. Pearce, B. Sibbald, and A. W. Stewart. "International Study of Asthma and Allergies in Childhood (ISAAC): rationale and methods." European respiratory journal 8, no. 3 (1995): 483–491.
 Beasley, Richard, William R. Roche, J. Alan Roberts, and Stephen T. Holgate. "Cellular events in the bronchi in mild asthma and after bronchial provocation." American Review of Respiratory Disease 139, no. 3 (1989): 806–817.
 Roche, William R., Julie H. Williams, Richard Beasley, and Stephen T. Holgate. "Subepithelial fibrosis in the bronchi of asthmatics." The Lancet 333, no. 8637 (1989): 520–524.

References

External links
 

Living people
University of Otago alumni
Academic staff of the Victoria University of Wellington
New Zealand medical researchers
Companions of the New Zealand Order of Merit
Fellows of the Royal Society of New Zealand
Year of birth missing (living people)